Egil Jacobsen (25 September 1899 – 14 December 1978) was a Norwegian footballer. He played in five matches for the Norway national football team from 1923 to 1927.

References

External links
 

1899 births
1978 deaths
Norwegian footballers
Norway international footballers
Place of birth missing
Association footballers not categorized by position